In Greek mythology, Amalthea or Amaltheia (Ancient Greek: Ἀμάλθεια) is the most-frequently mentioned foster-mother of Zeus.

Etymology
The name Amalthea, in Greek "tender goddess", is clearly an epithet, signifying the presence of an earlier nurturing goddess or maiden-goddess whom the Hellenes, whose myths we know, knew to be located in Crete, where Minoans may have called her a version of "Dikte".

Mythology 
There were different traditions regarding Amalthea. Amalthea is sometimes represented as the goat who suckled the infant-god in a cave in Cretan Mount Aigaion ("Goat Mountain"), sometimes as a goat-tending nymph of uncertain parentage (the daughter of Oceanus, Helios, Haemonius, or—according to Lactantius—Melisseus), who brought him up on the milk of her goat. The possession of multiple and uncertain mythological parents indicates wide worship of a deity in many cultures having varying local traditions. Other names, like Adrasteia, Ide, the nymph of Mount Ida, or Adamanthea, which appear in mythology handbooks, are simply duplicates of Amalthea.

In the tradition represented by Hesiod's Theogony,  Cronus swallowed all of his children immediately after birth. The mother goddess Rhea, Zeus' mother, deceived her brother-consort Cronus by giving him a stone wrapped to look like a baby instead of Zeus. Since she instead gave the infant Zeus to Adamanthea to nurse in a cave on a mountain in Crete, it is clear that Adamanthea is a doublet of Amalthea. In many literary references, the Greek tradition relates that in order that Cronus should not hear the wailing of the infant, Amalthea gathered about the cave the Kuretes or the Korybantes to dance, shout, and clash their spears against their shields.

The aegis
Amalthea's skin, or that of her goat, taken by Zeus in honor of her when she died, became the protective aegis in some traditions.

Among the stars
"Amaltheia was placed amongst the stars as the constellation Capra—the group of stars surrounding Capella on the arm (ôlenê) of Auriga the Charioteer." Capra simply means "she-goat" and the star-name Capella is the "little goat", but some modern readers confuse her with the male sea-goat of the Zodiac, Capricorn, who bears no relation to Amalthea, no connection in a Greek or Latin literary source nor any ritual or inscription to join the two. Hyginus describes this catasterism in the Poetic Astronomy, in speaking of Auriga, the Charioteer:

See also
Auðumbla, primeval cow in Norse mythology who nourished the primordial entities Ymir and Búri
Romulus and Remus, suckled by a she-wolf

Notes

References
 Apollodorus, The Library with an English Translation by Sir James George Frazer, F.B.A., F.R.S. in 2 Volumes, Cambridge, MA, Harvard University Press; London, William Heinemann Ltd. 1921. ISBN 0-674-99135-4. Online version at the Perseus Digital Library.
 Gee, Emma, Ovid, Aratus and Augustus: Astronomy in Ovid's Fasti, Cambridge University Press, 2000. .
 Graves, Robert, The Greek Myths: The Complete and Definitive Edition. Penguin Books Limited. 2017. 
Hesiod, Theogony, in The Homeric Hymns and Homerica with an English Translation by Hugh G. Evelyn-White, Cambridge, Mass., Harvard University Press; London, William Heinemann Ltd. 1914. Online version at the Perseus Digital Library.
 Hyginus, Gaius Julius, De Astronomica, in The Myths of Hyginus, edited and translated by Mary A. Grant, Lawrence: University of Kansas Press, 1960. Online version at ToposText.
Hyginus, Gaius Julius, Fabulae in Apollodorus' Library and Hyginus' Fabulae: Two Handbooks of Greek Mythology, Translated, with Introductions by R. Scott Smith and Stephen M. Trzaskoma, Hackett Publishing Company,  2007. .
 Kerenyi, Karl. The Gods of the Greeks. London: Thames & Hudson, 1951.
 Smith, William; "Amaltheia", Dictionary of Greek and Roman Biography and Mythology, London (1873).
 West, M. L. (1983), The Orphic Poems, Clarendon Press. .

External links 
 

Oceanids
Naiads
Mythological caprids
Metamorphoses in Greek mythology
Cretan characters in Greek mythology
Cretan mythology
Deeds of Zeus